Home and Away is an Australian television soap opera. It was first broadcast on the Seven Network on 17 January 1988. The following is a list of characters that first appeared during 2008, by order of first appearance. They were all introduced by series producer Cameron Welsh. The 21st season of Home and Away began airing from 28 January 2008.  Principal Martin Bartlett, played by Bob Baines was the first introduction of the year in February.  Trent Dalzell as Axel Hay, David Downer as Ross Buckton and Celeste Dodwell as Melody Jones made their first appearances in March. Tessa James arrived as Nicole Franklin in April. Jordan Rodrigues and Oliver Davis joined the cast as Jai Fernandez and Oliver Phillips in May. Esther Anderson and Rebecca Breeds made their debuts as Charlie and Ruby Buckton in June. Luke Jacobz and Paul Pantano debuted on 8 July as Angelo Rosetta and Elliot Gillen, respectively. David Jones-Roberts began appearing as Xavier Austin in November.

Martin Bartlett

Martin Bartlett portrayed by Bob Baines, made his first appearance on 12 February 2008. In one storyline Martin forms an attraction to his school secretary Kirsty Sutherland (Christie Hayes). Hayes told Jason Herbison from Inside Soap that "things are really awkward between Kirsty and Bartlett, because he's fallen for her in a big way, but she rejected him and is now dating Miles Copeland (Josh Quong Tart)." When he sacks Kirsty she takes a job as an escort. But she is unaware Martin uses escorts at the Sands resort. Hayes explained that Kirsty is "horrified to discover that her date is principal Bartlett. It's really humiliating for both of them, because Bartlett recently admitted to having feelings for Kirsty." She does not want to be there but Martin convinces her to stay.

Martin, who has taught Science for a number of years at Summer Bay High is introduced when Sally Fletcher (Kate Ritchie) introduces him as the new deputy, replacing the departed Donald Fisher (Norman Coburn). Following Sally's stabbing at the hands of Johnny Cooper (Callan Mulvey), Martin is appointed principal by the school board. One of his first acts is to hire Jazz Curtis (Rachel Gordon) as his secretary, after she blackmails him, after seeing him at an illegal fight Ric Dalby (Mark Furze) is involved in. He then sacks Jazz. After a clash with one of his former students, Kirsty, Martin hires her as Jazz's replacement. He forms an attraction to Kirsty, even to the extent of taking the blame for being Kirsty's three-year-old son, Oliver (Oliver Davis) breaking his arm while Annie Campbell (Charlotte Best) and Jai Fernandez (Jordan Rodrigues) are supposed to be babysitting him. He reveals to Kirsty that his mother brought him up on his own, like she is doing with Oliver while his father, Kane (Sam Atwell) is in prison.

Martin learns of Kirsty's relationship with Miles and he fires her but writes her a reference enabling her to get a job at the sands resort. Things escalate when Miles discovers Kirsty is working as an escort at the Sands, where Martin is paying for such services, leading to a confrontation between Miles and Martin. Martin causes further irritation when he reveals himself as Kirsty's secret benefactor.

At the senior formal which is held in the Surf Club which Martin hosts, Kane's car crashes through the wall. Martin tries to contain the panicky teenagers but is knocked to the ground and trampled, resulting in fractured ribs. He and Kane are hospitalized but recover.
Martin arranges a school trek in memory of Dan Baker (Tim Campbell) on the anniversary of his death for some of the students to take part in. Jai and Annie disappear much to his ire and things are exacerbated when Trey Palmer (Luke Bracey) holds the everybody hostage by planting a bomb underneath the bus. Hugo Austin (Bernard Curry) later defuses the bomb. The strain of recent events becomes apparent and Martin leaves for a cruise but not before appointing Gina Austin (Sonia Todd) new principal.

Axel Hay

Axel Hay portrayed by Trent Dalzell made his first appearance on 19 March 2008.

In the build-up to Axel's exit from the series, he and Jai Fernandez (Jordan Rodrigues) are knocked over by a drunken Larry Jefferies (Paul Gleeson) and he leaves the scene. Todd Lasance who plays Aden Jefferies in the series told Jason Herbison of Inside Soap that "suddenly you see Larry lose control of his car and hit something... While Jai's basically okay, Axel's rushed into hospital in a serious condition." But the two characters are left unable to remember who knocked them over. Lasance added that they do remember seeing a silver estate car, which makes him realise that his father was the perpetrator.

Axel is first seen alongside classmate Aden. Axel attends Nicole Franklin's (Tessa James) house party and makes advances towards on to Belle Taylor (Jessica Tovey) but is rejected. He then finds Melody Jones (Celeste Dodwell) crying in a bedroom and feigns an attempt to comfort her and attempts to rape her. When Geoff Campbell (Lincoln Lewis) finds out what happened, he threatens Axel, who is later beaten up and found on the beach by Belle. When Axel wakes up in hospital, he is reluctant to tell the police anything and suspicion falls on Geoff and Aden. Belle quickly works out Aden is responsible for Axel's attack after he shows his callous attitude, stating that Axel "got what he deserved". Axel's reputation later takes a dive and he apologises to Melody and makes friends with Jai. Axel and Jai are involved in a road accident caused by Aden's father, Axel dies as a result. Axel appears to Melody as a vision when she begins having nightmares about him.

Ross Buckton

Ross Michael Buckton, played by David Downer, made his first appearance on 21 May 2008. Ross arrives at Yabbie Creek Police Station to investigate the murder of Sam Holden (Jessica Chapnik). He interviews Martha MacKenzie (Jodi Gordon), the ex-wife of Sam's widower, Jack (Paul O'Brien) and quizzes her over a suicide note, which he believes to be fake. After some new evidence is discovered, Ross suspends the interview with Martha and brings Jazz Curtis (Rachel Gordon) in for questioning when new evidence is discovered.

Ross is determined to expose Jack and Martha as Sam's murderers but is unable to when Morag Bellingham (Cornelia Frances) proves that Sam committed suicide and he is forced to drop the charges. It is soon revealed that Ross and Morag were previously involved in a relationship after the collapse of Morag's marriage to Richard (John Bonney).

Ross and Morag begin dating again but a few hurdles get in the way of the relationship including Ross's lies about his wife Elsie's death and opposition from Ross' daughter, Charlie who sends texts warning Morag off. Ross' other daughter Ruby, is warmer to Morag and eventually Charlie accepts the relationship. Ross later proposes and he and Morag marry in a small ceremony with friends and family present before honeymooning in Europe.

Ross and Morag return to the bay the following year, It becomes apparent there are problems in the marriage when Morag appears stressed and Ross, forgetful. Ross disappears one night and is found wandering around by Charlie and tells her he is suffering from jetlag. The extent of Ross' problems becomes evident when he reopens a cold case and searches for a body only for Jack to find the case had been solved years ago. After He goes missing again, Ross is taken to the hospital and diagnosed with Alzheimers' by Rachel Armstrong (Amy Mathews). When Ross nearly burns down Leah Patterson-Baker's (Ada Nicodemou) house while trying to cook breakfast, he and his family realise he needs help. Ross agrees to go into care and Morag offers to go with him.

When Grant Bledcoe's (Clayton Watson) body is found on the beach, Charlie is the prime suspect and is suspended from the force, however, Ross comes forward and admits he killed Grant for raping Charlie when they were teenagers. Ross is then charged with Murder and awaits trial. In 2011, Ross dies and his funeral is held in Summer Bay.

Melody Jones

Melody Jones, played by Celeste Dodwell. Dodwell's casting was announced in December 2007, and had completed her drama HSC. Dodwell originally auditioned for the role of Nicole Franklin, however Tessa James became the successful candidate. Dodwell's agent informed her about Melody's "character breakdown" and she said that it "intrigued" her.
Dodwell later decided to quit the serial in order to attend drama school in the United Kingdom.

Nicole Franklin

Nicole Franklin, played by Tessa James, debuted on-screen during the episode airing on 18 April 2008. James' casting was announced in January 2008 it was announced Executive producer Cameron Welsh said "She is an exciting talent and I think audiences are going to love her character and respond really well to her." James then moved to Sydney especially for the role. Speaking of working on the serial James stated: "Working on a series like this [Home and Away] is the best training you can get, I look at it like an apprenticeship and never forget how lucky I am." Fellow cast member Celeste Dodwell who plays Melody Jones originally auditioned for the part of Nicole. Holy Soap said that Nicole's most memorable moment was when she "returned to the desert island with Geoff to rekindle their love" and she was held hostage by Derek the murderer, before her father came to the rescue. Inside Soap opined that Nicole was a "flighty minx from the city who prays at the altar of Paris Hilton". The Daily Record  branded her a "fiery favourite"TV Week chose James as one of the serial's most promising actresses opining she was ready for roles in Hollywood.

Jai Fernandez

Jai Fernandez, played by Jordan Rodrigues, first appeared during the episode transmitted on 19 May 2008. 
Rodrigues joined the cast in 2008 and he told Carolyn Stewart from TV Week that it had been a "whole new experience" for him because he was used to stage work. He added that he was excited about being recognised by viewers. Jai has a back story in which he lost his entire family in Phuket during the 2004 Boxing Day Tsunami and he met the established character of Miles Copeland (Josh Quong Tart) who had also suffered the deaths of his relatives. Rodrigues told Stewart that the character's loss created a "connection" between them and it made Miles bring Jai to Summer Bay. But as Miles previously left Jai in Phuket, this creates problems between them. Rodrigues explained that "Jai's angry at the world after Miles ditched him in Phuket. Miles is now trying to help Jai because he knew he was going through a tough time living in a refuge. But Jai is from the city and doesn't really fit in with the surfy town."

In 2009, Rodrgiues left the serial to join ABC's Dance Academy. For his portrayal of Jai, Rodrigues was nominated in the category of "Most Popular New Talent" at the Logie Awards of 2009.

Jai first appears at a refuge in the city when Miles tracks him down. He is cold and distant towards Miles who said he would always look after him following the deaths of his parents William and Nadieen in a tsunami. After initial reservations, Jai takes Miles up on his offer and returns to Summer Bay with him. Jai struggles to settle into Summer Bay House and struggles to connect with people at school. He makes a friend in fellow outcast Axel Hay (Trent Dalzell) and they get into various kinds of trouble and take a joyride on Matilda Hunter's (Indiana Evans) scooter. The boys are knocked off the Scooter by a drunken Larry Jefferies (Paul Gleeson) and Axel dies in hospital. In the aftermath, Jai becomes convinced he is invincible. He jumps from Jump Rock to prove so, much to the shock of Annie Campbell (Charlotte Best). When Matthew Lyons (Ross Pirelli) throws Jai's school rucksack on the roof of the school, he goes up to retrieve it, despite the danger. Annie, in retaliation tries Jai's stunt but hurts herself. After Jai feels guilty, they share a kiss and become a couple. Jai and Annie's respective guardians Miles and Irene Roberts (Lynne McGranger) try to keep the couple apart but they relent.

Jai and Annie end up in further trouble when Annie is stuck down a storm drain. Charlie Buckton (Esther Anderson) is able to rescue Annie. Trey Palmer (Luke Bracey) begins bullying Jai and harassing Miles and Kirsty Phillips (Christie Hayes). When Trey lies about a sexual relationship with Kirsty things spiral out of control, Jai obtains some information that Trey had weight issues and threatens to use it unless the charges are dropped.

Jai's relationship with Annie takes another turn when he drunkenly reveals at Ruby Buckton's (Rebecca Breeds) 16th birthday party, he wants to sleep with her. Annie promptly breaks up with him. Shortly after, Jai and Xavier Austin (David Jones-Roberts) find an old shotgun at Martha MacKenzie's (Jodi Gordon) farm, which results in Jai being accidentally shot. Jai keeps the injury secret but collapses several days later while on a school trek with Annie. He later recovers. Dexter Walker (Tom Green) takes an interest in Annie which does not sit well with Jai who wants to get back together with her. He is further upset when he finds Annie and Dexter kissing and refuses to listen to their explanations.

Jai's spirits are lifted when Romeo Smith (Luke Mitchell), an old friend from foster care arrives to stay at Summer Bay House. He asks Romeo for his help to win Annie back but the plan backfires when Romeo allows Annie to believe he is responsible for the love poems Jai has been sending her and Jai realises Romeo wants Annie for himself. Jai then accepts a place on the student exchange trip to Japan in order to get away from them both but opts out after Kirsty miscarries Miles' baby and offers to support them and suggests Annie take his place. In the end, both Jai and Annie leave for Japan after a farewell with their friends.

Oliver Phillips

Oliver "Ollie" Phillips is the son of Kirsty (Christie Hayes) and Kane Phillips (Sam Atwell). Ollie is first seen when Irene Roberts (Lynne McGranger) collects him after receiving a phone call. Irene contacts Rachel Armstrong (Amy Mathews) when she discovers Ollie is running a temperature and tells Ollie not to answer any questions when he is asked. Rachel arrives and tells Irene that Ollie needs hospital treatment.

While in hospital, Ollie still remains silent despite efforts from the doctors and police. Kane, who is a fugitive, secretly visits . Several days later, Kirsty takes Ollie out of hospital and attempts to flee after Kane's failed Robbery attempt. There is a police chase but Kane drops them back at Irene's and is arrested and jailed.

Ollie and Kirsty stay with Irene, but problems are caused when Ollie bursts into Belle Taylor's (Jessica Tovey) room exposing her relationship with Aden Jefferies (Todd Lasance) to Geoff Campbell (Lincoln Lewis) and Annie Campbell (Charlotte Best). He causes further problem by colouring on Belle's work. Kirsty then decides to move them into the caravan park, next to her old home Summer Bay house. Miles Copeland invites them to move into the house and they form a family unit with Miles and Jai.

When Kane is released from prison, Ollie spots him in the park and asks him to keep quiet but he is excited and mentions it. Kane decides he wants his family back and the three of them leave. They return however when Kane and Kirsty have relationship difficulties. Ollie is upset when Kane leaves for good but is happy to be back in the bay.

Kirsty discovers she is pregnant and breaks the news to Ollie. He is happy about the idea of a sibling. However, Kirsty loses the baby. Ollie meets his grandmother Shelley Sutherland (Paula Forrest) for the first time when she arrives to comfort Kirsty. Shelley then takes Kirsty and Ollie back to live with the family in the city.

Charlie Buckton

Charlie Buckton made her on-screen debut in the episode airing on 6 June 2008. Anderson, a former model was recruited by Home and Away in a bid to add "sex appeal" to the show. Anderson was a long-time fan of Home and Away and she said she was "thrilled" when she won the role of Charlie after an audition. In November 2011, Jonathon Moran and Elle Halliwell of The Daily Telegraph announced Anderson had quit Home and Away to further her acting career in Hollywood. The following month, Inside Soap writer Sarah Ellis reported Anderson had confirmed her departure from the show. For her portrayal of Charlie, Anderson received a nomination for "Sexiest Female" at the 2008 Inside Soap Awards. In 2010, she was nominated for "Best Daytime Star". That same year saw Anderson earn nominations for the "Most Popular Personality on Australian Television" and "Most Popular Actress" Logie Awards. The episode featuring Charlie's death was nominated for an Australian Writers' Guild award. Kerry Barrett and Carena Crawford of All About Soap said Charlie was both a "sexy sergeant" and the soap opera's "cutest crime fighter".

Ruby Buckton

Ruby Buckton played by Rebecca Breeds, debuted on-scree on 20 June 2008. Ruby was created by executive producer Cameron Welsh. The serial's official website describes Ruby as being care free, though puts on a front to hide her emotions. Ruby arrives grieving for the loss of her mother, unlike her sister, Ruby takes an "internal approach and bottled it up inside", creating a facade and appearing to be strong. They also brand her as independent and does not care what others think about her and is inclined to keep to herself. Breeds stated: "Ruby has gone through a lot and had to gain a level of independence I really admire. She is free-spirited and sure of whom she is. I love playing Ruby; she is cheeky and easy-going, but very passionate about her family." 
In June 2012, Erin Miller of "TV Week" was reported that Breeds had filmed her final scenes and left Home and Away. Breeds told Miller that she could not discuss her departure because of her contract with the series. She added that "Ruby is still very much alive, I'm not free of Ruby just yet". Breeds received a Logie Award nomination for "Most Popular New Female Talent" at the 51st Logie Awards for her portrayal of Ruby. and was later nominated for the "Most Popular Actress" Logie in 2010, with Breeds stating: "To know that people like Ruby makes me think I'm doing a good job." At the 2012 Inside Soap Awards, Breeds was nominated for "Best Daytime Star". Holy Soap recall Ruby's most memorable moment as being: "Trying to cope with her Dad's illness, Ruby started talking to someone on Skype, only to find out it was Matthew playing a trick. She got revenge by convincing him to go skinny-dipping and nicking his clothes."

Angelo Rosetta

Angelo Rosetta, played by Luke Jacobz debuted on 8 July 2008. Jacobz won the role of Angelo in June 2008, following the axing of McLeod's Daughters, with which he had a recurring role. The Courier-Mail reported that Jacobz had moved from South Australia to Sydney and was going to sign up to work as a labourer, when he received the offer to play Angelo. Jacobz was originally signed to the show for six months. In February 2011, a writer for TV Week announced that Jacobz had left Home and Away. They said Jacobz would be seen on screen for a few more months, but the actor had finished filming. The serial's official website describe Angelo stating: "Growing up in a close-knit family; with three brothers, Angelo was generally perceived as the loudmouth, boofhead kid who would never amount to much." 
Jacobz received a nomination for 'Most Popular Actor' at the 2010 Logie Awards for his portrayal of Angelo. In the same year, he was also nominated for "Best Daytime Star" at the Inside Soap Awards.

Elliot Gillen

Elliot Gillen played by Paul Pantano, made his first appearance on 8 July and departed on 26 August 2008. Pantano was included in Digital Spy's gay feature. In one storyline Elliot sets puts the lives of Roman Harris (Conrad Coleby), Nicole Franklin (Tessa James) and Geoff Campbell (Lincoln Lewis) in danger. Elliot blames Roman for his brother's death and warns Nicole that he wants revenge. Roman is left stranded in the bush while Nicole and Geoff become stranded on an island. James told a reporter from Inside Soap that Elliot causes Geoff injuries when he attacks him with a speargun. She added that "Elliot sets up a life and death obstacle coursefor Roman to work his way through".

Elliot arrives in Summer Bay in search of Roman. It soon emerges that Elliot's brother, Mark had served in the SAS with Roman but had been killed when they were deployed to Afghanistan. Near the second Anniversary of Mark's death, Elliot presses Roman for the truth, despite hearing an official enquiry. Roman tells him that their group had been ambushed and outnumbered by the enemy and Mark was lost and presumed dead. Elliot refuses to accept this story and begins playing mind games with Roman, first by dating his 17-year-old daughter, Nicole. Roman tries to warn Nicole off but she refuses to listen. However the relationship breaks down and Elliot snaps and sets up the second phase of his plan to get to Roman. He kidnaps Nicole and leaves a ransom DVD for Roman instructing him to drink a flask of liquid or he will never see her again. Elliot forces Nicole onto a boat preparing to take her out to sea when they are spotted by Geoff Campbell who decides to join them. Once out at sea Elliot and Nicole leave the boat where Elliot tightens her oxygen tank around her causing her to struggle to stay afloat. Elliot then returns to the boat without her where he is confronted by Geoff asking her we she is but Elliot grabs a spear gun and shoots him in the leg leaving them both out at sea.

After Roman complies and drinks the flask he finds himself hanging upside down from a cliff edge. Elliot then sets some traps for Roman to follow. While following the path, Roman is shot in the arm by Elliot with an arrow, narrowly misses a landslide and survives a mine blast attached to a tripwire before quickly overpowering Elliot just as he's about to leave the bush by knocking him out, and is then taken to Yabbie Creek police station and arrested.

While in custody, Roman tells Elliot that Mark had wanted to surrender when they were ambushed and threatened to shoot Adam, a member of their own squad if they did not and that he had to shoot Mark to prevent him from doing so and the enemy captured and killed him while Roman and the others escaped. Elliot then breaks down and reveals Nicole's location on the island before being charged with kidnapping and attempted murder.

Xavier Austin

Xavier Austin, played by David Jones-Roberts made his first appearance on 20 November 2008 and departed on 3 July 2012, Xavier was seen leaving Summer Bay to live in Goulburn permanently. Jones-Roberts had previously auditioned for the serial four times before landing the role of Xavier and stated the result was "all the more awesome" because he had to wait for such a long time. Whilst surfing his agent told him he had the role over a pay-phone
Soap opera reporting website Holy Soap recall Xavier's most memorable moment as being: "Watching in horror as Brendan caused a horrific car accident with his catapult."

Others

References

External links
Characters and cast at the Official AU Home and Away website
Characters and cast at the Official UK Home and Away website
Characters and cast at the Internet Movie Database

, 2008
, Home and Away